Federico E. Rey is a professor of bacteriology at University of Wisconsin-Madison. His research focuses on human gut microbiota and its relationship to cardiometabolic disease. He has been a professor at University of Wisconsin-Madison since 2013 and has published over 90 papers. Rey received his PhD from the National University of Córdoba in Argentina.

Rey was a recipient of the International Atherosclerosis Society Fellowship award in 2015.

References 

National University of Córdoba alumni
Bacteriologists
University of Wisconsin–Madison faculty
American scientists
Year of birth missing (living people)
Living people